Sahil Satish Vaid is an Indian dubbing artist and actor who is known for his roles in Bittoo Boss (2012), Humpty Sharma Ki Dulhania (2014), Bank Chor (2017), Badrinath Ki Dulhania (2017), Dil Bechara (2020) and Coolie No. 1 (2020).

Career
Vaid has starred in a number of plays over the past 17 years. He started his career with school theatre, professionally acting for stage since 1997. He made his Bollywood debut in 2012 with Bittoo Boss. Early in his career, Sahil was recognised for portraying a variety of roles in the first online stand-up comedy show Jay Hind!. He then rose to prominence after starring in Humpty Sharma Ki Dulhania (2014). He was also seen in Bittoo Boss (2012), Badrinath Ki Dulhania (2017), Bank Chor (2017), Dil Bechara (2020), Coolie No. 1 (2020).

Filmography

As actor

As voice actor

Live action television series

Live action films

Hollywood films

Indian films

Animated films

References

External links

Living people
Male actors from Mumbai
Indian male film actors
Indian male television actors
Indian voice actors
Year of birth missing (living people)